Big Stan is a vehicle-mounted drill rig built in 1986 by Anderson Drilling. The rig has been used on a number of construction projects in which conventional, smaller drilling rigs were unable to be used, particularly when projects call for drilling into hard soil. Notably, Big Stan was used in the construction of the First National Bank Tower in Omaha, the Benicia-Martinez bridge near San Francisco, and on expansions to the I-15/215 Beltway in Las Vegas. The drill rig was featured on Discovery Channel’s show “Monster Machines” in 2007.

Big Stan features a two-piece design, significantly lowering the time and manpower needed to assemble it compared to contemporary rigs. The rig has been estimated as one of, if not the largest, vehicle-mounted drilling rigs in the world.

History 
Big Stan was built in 1986 by Anderson Drilling (Now part of Keller Group PLC) in Lakeside, California. The machine cost $1.5 million to construct and was named after the company president at the time, Stan Anderson, who was given a similar nickname due to his height of 6 ft 3 in (1.91 m). At the time, Big Stan was claimed to be the largest portable drill rig in the United States, with some estimates placing it as the largest vehicle-mounted drill rig in the world.

From May to June 1999, Big Stan was used to drill the caissons for the First National Bank Tower in Omaha, Nebraska. In 2004, while working on an expansion to the Benicia-Martinez bridge near San Francisco, Big Stan was filmed by Discovery Channel’s Canadian outlet for the show “Monster Machines”. The episode aired in 2007. In June 2007, Big Stan was used in the construction of the Pacific Street Bridge, in Oceanside, California. That same year, Big Stan was used for construction work on the Upper Northwest Interceptor sewage system. These tunnels were later finished by Vadnais Corp. who horizontally connected the segments by micro-tunneling. In January 2009, Big Stan was taken to La Plata County, Colorado to drill at the Ridges Basin Dam. Here, it bored a -deep,  diameter shaft as part of a larger project to build irrigation infrastructure to the surrounding homes. That same year, Big Stan was taken to Snyder, Texas to work on the Snyder Wind Energy Project.

In August 2011, the drill rig was moved to Nevada to work on expansions to Interstate 15 in Las Vegas. The drill was contracted due to the lack of machines capable of breaking up the caliche-laden sedimentary rock present in the region. In addition, it was also used in the construction of the Blue Diamond Road flyover. Later that month, Big Stan was used to drill the foundation for the Gold Line basket bridge in Los Angeles, California.  In 2015, Big Stan was used in the construction of the Yucca Loma Bridge in Apple Valley, California.

Design 

The truck Big Stan is normally mounted to is equipped with 5 hydraulic jacks designed to lift, tilt, and lower the drill. These hydraulic jacks can also be used for rig assembly and breakdown. Big Stan can uniquely be split into two pieces which can be transported independently. When split apart, the engine and upper tower are  carried by a 7-axle tractor-trailer, while the lower tower and rest of the drill are carried by a 5-axle tractor-trailer. This is in contrast to other contemporary drill rigs, which required being dismantled into 8 to 10 pieces for transport. This design, along with the vehicle mount's built-in hydraulic jacks, allow a team of two people to assemble the rig in 30 minutes, compared to other contemporary rigs that required upwards of a week to properly set up.

Big Stan features a screw conveyor, or auger, as its primary means of excavating soil. The drill is capable of boring down  at up to 39 rpm and its auger weighs . The rotary table has a  diameter, double-pinion ring gear driven by a six-speed transmission built by Allison transmission, through a drivetrain with two  drivebelts made by Clark.

See also 

 Tunnel boring machine
 Trenchless technology
 Boring (manufacturing)

References 

Drilling rigs
Construction